Rufat Quliyev may refer to:
 Rufat Quliyev (footballer), Azerbaijani football player
 Rufet Quliyev, economist and politician